County routes in Cattaraugus County, New York, are signed with the Manual on Uniform Traffic Control Devices-standard yellow-on-blue pentagon route marker. A handful of pre-MUTCD black-on-yellow rectangular markers still exist on the most remote county road intersections (Cattaraugus County did not switch to the MUTCD markers until the late 1990s). With one exception, county routes in Cattaraugus County are not signed with direction markers (e.g. North–South or East–West); one location on Route 10 in Coldspring has signs bearing North and South markers.

As a general rule, Cattaraugus County does not maintain routes within reservations, villages or cities. For routes that enter such municipalities, county maintenance (and the route number) usually stops at the municipal border, with the exceptions of CR 4, which enters the village of Gowanda, and CR 12, which does enter the village of Cattaraugus. Every town in Cattaraugus County except for Red House has at least one county route within its borders.

Routes 1–50

Routes 51 and up

See also

County routes in New York
List of former state routes in New York (201–300)

References

External links
Empire State Roads – Cattaraugus County Roads